Ignacio Francisco Chicco (born 30 June 1996) is an Argentine professional footballer who plays as a goalkeeper for Colón.

Career
Chicco, after a stint with local team Deportivo Brinkmann, joined the ranks of Colón in 2010. In August 2016, Chicco was loaned to fellow Primera División team Talleres. He didn't make a competitive appearance for the Córdoba outfit, though was an unused substitute on nine occasions. Chicco returned to Colón ahead of the 2017–18 campaign. He'd be on the bench forty times for them across the following three seasons. Chicco belatedly made his bow in professional football on 8 August 2019, appearing for the full duration of a Copa Sudamericana first leg loss in Venezuela to Zulia.

Personal life
Chicco's brother, Julián, is also a professional footballer. The two played against each other at youth level in January 2018.

Career statistics
.

References

External links

1996 births
Living people
Sportspeople from Córdoba Province, Argentina
Argentine people of Italian descent
Argentine footballers
Association football goalkeepers
Club Atlético Colón footballers
Talleres de Córdoba footballers